Gohin Baluchor is a 2017 Bangladeshi drama film directed by Badrul Anam Saud and starring Suborna Mustafa, Raisul Islam Asad, Fazlur Rahman Babu, Afroza Banu, Jeetu Ahsan, Runa Khan, Shormi Mala, Shahana Rahman Sumi, Neelanjona Neela, Abu Hurayra Tanvir, Jannatun Nur Moon

Plot 
This film is about a love story between a boy and a girl living in a village (Dapdapia under the Nalchity upazila of Jhalokathi District) which is very near of a  sugandha river. One day a piece of floating land (Chor) rises in the water. This piece of land was once submerged in the river. The feud between two villages over the ownership of the risen land and the fate of the star crossed lovers will unfold in this film. The story will mirror the longing desires, determined struggles, hope & frustration, personal interest, big or little sorrows and happiness of the villagers.

Cast 
 Suborna Mustafa
 Raisul Islam Asad
 Fazlur Rahman Babu
 Neelanjona Neela
 Abu Hurayra Tanvir
 Jannatun Nur Moon
 Runa Khan
 Jeetu Ahsan
 Shahadat Hossain
 Shormi Mala
 Shahnaz Sumi
 Afroza Banu
 Lutfur Rahman George
 Abdullah Al Mamun
 Md Rasel Mahamud

Release 
Previously announced the movie release date is October 20, But the director has decided to release on December 29, 2017. The movie was released in 28 cinemas. The reason is the success of Dhaka Attack, Saud explains, "At this moment, the picture of Dipankar Deepan, Director of Dhaka Attack is doing very well. We both worked on a small screen. The first picture of both So I turned my picture behind." The story, 'Gohin Baluchor', is a dialogue and screenplay, written by director Saud himself.

References

External links 
 

2017 films
2017 drama films
Bengali-language Bangladeshi films
Bangladeshi drama films
Films scored by Emon Saha
2010s Bengali-language films
Government of Bangladesh grants films